Crans-Montana is a municipality in the district of Sierre in the canton of Valais, Switzerland.  On 1 January 2017 the former municipalities of Chermignon, Mollens, Montana and Randogne merged to form the new municipality of Crans-Montana.  

Crans-Montana is also a ski resort that was created through the fusion of the two centres of Crans and Montana and belonged to six municipalities (Chermignon, Icogne, Lens, Mollens, Montana and Randogne), four of which merged to form the municipality of Crans-Montana.

History

Chermignon
Chermignon is first mentioned in 1228 as Chermenon and Chirminon.  It became an independent municipality in 1905 when it separated from Lens.

Mollens
Mollens is first mentioned about 1250 as Molaen.  In 1286 it was mentioned as Moleing.  The municipality was formerly known by its German name Molei, however, that name is no longer used.

Montana
Montana is first mentioned in 1243 as Montana.  In 1905 it separated from Lens to form an independent municipality.

Randogne
Randogne is first mentioned in 1224 as Randonni.

Ski resort

The resort is located in the heart of the Swiss Alps in the French-speaking part of the canton of Valais. The resort is a fusion of the two centres of Crans and Montana and belongs to 6 municipalities (Chermignon, Icogne, Lens, Mollens, Montana and Randogne).

Crans-Montana is famous in alpine ski racing for the 1987 World Championships and is often on the World Cup schedule, usually for women's speed events.

Other activities
The area has also been frequently used for bicycle racing, hosting stage finishes of the Tour de Suisse seven times and of the Tour de Romandie eight times as of 2013. In addition, Crans-Montana also hosted the finish of the 20th stage of the 1984 Tour de France, won by Laurent Fignon, who also took the overall race win that year.

The  has four courses, one designed by Seve Ballesteros and another named after Jack Nicklaus.

The internationally renowned Les Roches International School of Hotel Management is located in Crans-Montana.

Geography

Population

Historic population
The historical population is given in the following chart:

Heritage sites of national significance
The Roches des Fées and the Hotel Bella Lui are listed as Swiss heritage site of national significance.

Climate
Crans Montana has a warm summer humid continental climate, (Dfb) according to the Köppen climate classification. Between 1981 and 2010 Montana had on average 101 days of rain or snow per year and received on average  of precipitation. Crans Montana has fairly evenly distributed precipitation throughout the year, as is common in this type of climate. As with other locations in the canton of Valais, annual precipitation rates are quite low due to its location in the rain shadow of some of the tallest mountains in the Alps.

Transport 
The Funiculaire Sierre–Montana–Crans leads from Montana to Sierre, next to the Sierre/Siders railway station.

Notable people
 Elizabeth von Arnim (1866–1941), Australian-born British novelist, lived in Randogne 1910–1930
 Katherine Mansfield (1888–1923), New Zealand-born author, lived in Montana from May 1921–January 1922
 Roger Moore (1927–2017), British actor, owned a chalet at the ski resort for many years after moving from Gstaad. He lived there until his death in 2017. 
 Michel Roux (1941–2020), French-born chef and restaurateur who worked in Britain, lived in Crans-Montana from 2008.
 Golfers Adam Scott, Ángel Gallardo, Sergio García along with Francesco and Edoardo Molinari are residents.

References

External links

 
 Crans-Montana ski resort

Municipalities of Valais
Cultural property of national significance in Valais
Villages in Valais
Ski areas and resorts in Switzerland